Travis Victor Alexander (July 28, 1977 – June 4, 2008) was an American salesman who was murdered by his ex-girlfriend, Jodi Ann Arias (born July 9, 1980), in his house in Mesa, Arizona. Arias was convicted of first-degree murder on May 8, 2013, and sentenced to life in prison without the possibility of parole on April 13, 2015.

At the time of the murder, Alexander suffered 27 knife wounds and a gunshot to the head. Arias testified that she killed him in self-defense, but she was convicted by the jury of first-degree murder. During the sentencing phase, the jury deadlocked on the death penalty option, and Arias was thus sentenced to life imprisonment without the possibility of parole. The murder and trial received widespread media attention in the United States.

Background
Travis Victor Alexander was born on July 28, 1977, in Riverside, California, to Gary David Alexander (1948–1997) and Pamela Elizabeth Morgan Alexander (1953–2005). At the age of 11, Travis moved in with his paternal grandparents. After his father's death in July 1997, his seven siblings were also taken in by their paternal grandmother. Alexander was a salesman and motivational speaker for Pre-Paid Legal Services (PPL).

Jodi Ann Arias was born on July 9, 1980, in Salinas, California, to William and Sandra (née Allen) Arias. 
Arias and Alexander met in September 2006 at a PPL conference in Las Vegas, Nevada. Arias converted to the Church of Jesus Christ of Latter-day Saints, of which Alexander was a member, and was baptized by him on November 26, 2006 in a ceremony in Southern California. Alexander and Arias began dating in February 2007. Arias moved to Mesa to live closer to Alexander. In April 2008, she moved to Yreka, California, and lived there with her grandparents.

Alexander and Arias dated intermittently for a year and a half, often in a long-distance relationship, taking turns traveling between their respective Arizona and California homes. Alexander's friends who knew Arias and observed them together tended to have a negative opinion of her, stating that the relationship was unusually tumultuous and that Arias' behavior was worrying.

Murder
Alexander was murdered on Wednesday, June 4, 2008. He suffered 27 stab wounds, a slit throat, and a gunshot wound to the head. Medical examiner Kevin Horn would later testify that Alexander's jugular vein, common carotid artery, and trachea had been slashed and that he had defensive wounds on his hands. Horn further testified that Alexander may have been dead at the time the gunshot was inflicted, and that the back wounds were shallow. Alexander's death was ruled a homicide. He was buried at Riverside's Olivewood Memorial Park cemetery.

Discovery and investigation

In early 2008, Alexander told acquaintances that Arias would join him for a work-related trip to Cancún, Mexico scheduled for June 15. In April, Alexander asked to change his travel companion to another female friend, Marie Hall. On May 28, a burglary occurred at the residence of Arias' grandparents, with whom Arias was living. Among the missing objects was a handgun chambered in .25 caliber, which was never recovered. This later became significant as a shell case from a spent .25 caliber round was found near Alexander's body at the murder scene.

On June 2 between 1:00 a.m. and 3:00 a.m., Arias called Alexander four times but did not appear to reach him, as the longest of the calls' durations was 17 seconds. After 3:00 a.m., Alexander called Arias twice, the first time for 18 minutes, the second time for 41 minutes. At 4:03 a.m., Arias called Alexander again, and the call lasted two minutes, 48 seconds. Neither these calls nor their transcripts were presented in Arias' trial. At 5:39 a.m., Arias drove south to rent a car for a long trip to Utah, as evidenced by a gasoline purchase in Yreka. On June 2 at 8:04 a.m., Arias rented a car in Redding, California and indicated that she would return the car to the same location. Arias visited friends in southern California on her way to Utah for a PPL work conference and to meet with Ryan Burns, a PPL co-worker. By late evening on June 3, Arias had apparently set out for Salt Lake City.

Alexander missed an important conference call on the evening of June 4. The following day, Arias met Burns in the Salt Lake City suburb of West Jordan and attended business meetings for the conference. Burns later said that he noticed that Arias' formerly blond hair was now dark brown and that she had cuts on her hands. On June 6, she left Salt Lake City and drove west toward California. She called Alexander several times and left several voicemail messages for him. She also accessed his cell-phone voicemail system. The rental clerk testified that the car was missing its floor mats and had red stains on its front and rear seats. However, it could not be verified that the car had floor mats when Arias had picked it up, and the red stains could not be analyzed as the car was cleaned before police could examine it.

On June 9, having been unable to reach Alexander, a concerned group of friends went to his home. His roommates had not seen him for several days, but they believed that he was out of town and thus did not suspect that anything was amiss. After finding a key to Alexander's bedroom, the group entered and found large pools of blood in the hallway to the master bathroom and Alexander's body in the shower. In the 9-1-1 call (not heard by the jury), the dispatcher asked whether Alexander had been suicidal or if anyone was angry enough to hurt him. Alexander's friends mentioned Arias by name as a possible suspect, stating that Alexander had told them that she had been stalking him, accessing his Facebook account and slashing his car's tires.

While searching Alexander's home, police found his recently purchased digital camera damaged in the washing machine. Police were able to recover deleted images showing Arias and Alexander in sexually suggestive poses taken at approximately 1:40 p.m. on June 4. The final photograph of Alexander alive, showing him in the shower, was taken at 5:29 p.m. that day. Photos taken moments later show an individual believed to be Alexander "profusely bleeding" on the bathroom floor. A bloody palm print was discovered along the wall in the bathroom hallway; it contained DNA from both Arias and Alexander.

On July 9, 2008, Arias was indicted by a grand jury in Maricopa County, Arizona for the first-degree murder of Alexander. She was arrested at her home six days later and was extradited to Arizona on September 5. Arias pleaded not guilty on September 11. During this time, she provided several different accounts about her involvement in Alexander's death. She first told police that she had not been in Mesa on the day of the murder and had last seen Alexander in March 2008. Arias later told police that two intruders had broken into Alexander's home, murdering him and attacking her. Two years after her arrest, Arias told police that she killed Alexander in self-defense, claiming that she had been a victim of domestic violence.

Pre-trial
On April 6, 2009, a motion to reconsider the defendant's motion to disqualify the Maricopa County District Attorney's office was denied. On May 18, the court ordered Arias to submit to IQ and competency testing. In January 2011, a defense filing detailed Arias' attorneys' efforts to obtain text messages and emails. The prosecution initially told defense attorneys that no text messages that had been sent or received by Alexander were available, but the prosecution was then ordered to turn over several hundred such messages. Mesa police detective Esteban Flores told defense attorneys that there was nothing "out of the ordinary" among Alexander's emails; about 8,000 were turned over to the defense in June 2009.

Trial

Jury selection
The trial commenced in Maricopa County Superior Court before judge Sherry K. Stephens. The voir dire proceedings began on December 10, 2012. On December 20, Arias' attorneys argued that the prosecution was "systematically excluding" women and Black people; prosecutor Juan Martinez said that race and sex were irrelevant to his decisions to strike certain jurors. Stephens ruled that the prosecution had shown no bias in the jury selection.

Guilt phase
In opening arguments on January 2, 2013, Martinez sought the death penalty. Arias was represented by appointed counsel L. Kirk Nurmi and Jennifer Willmott, who argued that Alexander's death was a justifiable homicide committed in self-defense.

Ryan Burns testified that when Arias visited him in Utah, the two spent several hours hugging and kissing on a large bean-bag chair. She told him that she had cut her hands on broken glass while working at a restaurant called Margaritaville. A detective testified that no restaurant by that name had ever existed in the Yreka area; at the time, Arias was working at a restaurant called Casa Ramos. Arias later testified that after she cut her finger, "I had a bazillion margaritas to make." Later, the prosecution argued that the presence of a .25 caliber round found near Alexander's body and the theft of a handgun of the same caliber from Arias' residence in Yreka the previous week proved that she had staged the burglary and used the gun to kill Alexander. Martinez claimed that Arias had stalked Alexander and had slashed his tires twice. In the final days before his death, Alexander called her a "sociopath" and "the worst thing that ever happened to me," and stated that he was afraid of her.

Arias took the stand in her own defense on February 4, 2013, testifying for a total of 18 days, a duration described by criminal defense attorney Mark Geragos as "unprecedented." On the first day of her testimony, Arias told of being violently abused by her parents from the age of seven. She testified that she had rented a car in Redding because Budget's website provided two options, one to the north and one to the south, and her brother lived in Redding. On her second day on the stand, Arias said that her relationship with Alexander included oral sex and sodomy; she said that the sodomy was painful the first time she experienced it and that Alexander believed that such activities would not contravene Mormon rules concerning vaginal intercourse. Arias said that she and Alexander eventually had intercourse, but less often. A phone sex tape was played in court that Arias had recorded without Alexander's knowledge, apparently hoping to use it to embarrass him to his Mormon peers. Arias also testified that Alexander secretly harbored pedophilic desires for both male and female children, and that she tried to help him with these urges. Forensic experts testified that an examination of Alexander's computer found no evidence of pornographic material.

Arias testified that her relationship with Alexander became increasingly physically and emotionally abusive. She said that Alexander shook her while saying, "I'm fucking sick of you," then began "screaming at me," after which he "body slammed me on the floor at the foot of his bed" and taunted her, saying, "don't act like that hurts" before he called her a "bitch" and kicked her in the ribs. Arias said that "he went to kick me again, and I put my hand out." She held up her left hand in the courtroom, showing that her ring finger was crooked. Arias claimed that she killed Alexander in self-defense after he had attacked her when she dropped his camera, forcing her to fight for her life. This was Arias' third different account of the events leading to Alexander's death, which prosecutors, courtroom observers and jurors felt severely damaged her credibility. Rebuttal witnesses called by the prosecution included several of Alexander's other girlfriends, who stated that he never exhibited any problems with anger or violence.

During the trial, videotape of a September 2008 Inside Edition interview was played in which Arias had said: "No jury is going to convict me ... because I am innocent. You can mark my words on that." Discussing the statement during her testimony, Arias said, "At the time [of the interview], I had plans to commit suicide. So I was extremely confident that no jury would convict me, because I didn't expect any of you to be here." At the close of his cross-examination of Arias, Martinez replayed the video and prompted Arias to affirm that she had said during the interview that she would not be convicted because she was innocent. When being questioned by Martinez, Arias was initially combative and flippant, but after several days, Martinez highlighted the possible lies and inconsistencies in her testimony, and she admitted to stabbing and shooting Alexander despite her earlier claims of a memory lapse. Jury foreman William Zervakos later expressed an opinion common to jurors and observers when he told ABC's Good Morning America: "I think eighteen days hurt her. I think she was not a good witness."

Beginning on March 14, psychologist Richard Samuels testified for the defense for nearly six days. He said that Arias had likely been suffering from acute stress at the time of the murder, sending her body into a "fight or flight" mode to defend herself, which caused her brain to stop retaining memory. In response to a juror's question asking whether this scenario could occur even if this was a premeditated murder, as the prosecution contended, he responded: "Is it possible? Yes. Is it probable? No." Samuels also diagnosed Arias with post traumatic stress disorder (PTSD). Martinez attacked Samuels' credibility, accusing him of bias and of having formed a relationship with Arias; Samuels had previously testified that he had compassion for Arias. Beginning on March 26, Alyce LaViolette, a psychotherapist who specializes in domestic violence, testified that Arias was a victim of domestic abuse, and that most victims do not tell anyone because they feel ashamed and humiliated. LaViolette summarized emails from Alexander's close friends: "They have basically advised Ms. Arias to move on from the relationship ... that Mr. Alexander has been abusive to women." The jury posed nearly 160 questions to LaViolette, many of them focusing on Arias' credibility.

Clinical psychologist Janeen DeMarte testified for the prosecution, stating she found no evidence that Alexander had abused Arias, and no evidence of PTSD or amnesia in Arias. Furthermore, DeMarte testified how Arias's claims of complete amnesia for long periods is inconsistent with traumatic amnesia associated with PTSD, which manifests as gaps in memory for shorter periods of time. Instead, DeMarte said that Arias suffered from borderline personality disorder, showing signs of immaturity and an "unstable sense of identity." People who suffer from such a disorder "have a terrified feeling of being abandoned by others," DeMarte told jurors. The final defense witness was psychologist Robert Geffner, who said that DeMarte's borderline diagnosis was "not appropriate" and that all tests taken by Arias since her arrest pointed toward an anxiety disorder stemming from trauma. He also said that the tests indicated that she had answered questions honestly. The state recalled Horn, who testified further on the gunshot wound, and called forensic neuropsychologist Jill Hayes, who disputed Geffner's testimony that the MMPI test was not geared toward diagnosing borderline personality disorder.

Responding to Arias' testimony about buying a five-gallon gas can at a Walmart store in Salinas on June 3, 2008 that she returned on the same day, on April 24 the prosecution called Amanda Webb, a Salinas Walmart store employee, to the stand. Webb said that, according to Walmart's records, no one had returned a five-gallon gas can on that date, and that Arias returned the gas can one week after having purchased it. The gas-can evidence was seen as important in establishing premeditation, as the prosecutor argued that Arias was trying to avoid being recorded on gas-station security cameras as she drove to Mesa.

In closing arguments on May 4, Arias' defense argued that the premeditation theory did not make sense. "What happened in that moment in time? The relationship, the relationship of chaos, that ended in chaos as well. There is nothing about what happened on June 4th in that bathroom that looks planned ... Couldn't it also be that after everything they went through in that relationship, that she simply snapped? ... Ultimately, if Miss Arias is guilty of any crime at all, it is the crime of manslaughter and nothing more." In rebuttal, Martinez described the extent and variety of Alexander's wounds: "There is no evidence that he ever laid a hand on her, ever. Nothing indicates that this is anything less than a slaughter. There was no way to appease this woman who just wouldn't leave him alone."

Arias' testimony added to a very long defense portion of the guilt phase of the trial, which led to problems with retention of jury members. On April 3, a jury member was dismissed for "misconduct." The defense asked for a mistrial, which the judge denied. On April 12, another juror was excused for health reasons. A third juror was dismissed on April 25 after being arrested for a DUI offense. By April 25, defense costs had reached almost $1.7 million.

On May 7, 2013, after 15 hours of deliberation, Arias was found guilty of first-degree murder. All twelve jurors found her guilty of first-degree premeditated murder, of which seven additionally found her guilty of felony murder. As the verdict was read, Alexander's family smiled and hugged one another. Crowds outside the courtroom began cheering and chanting.

Aggravation phase
Following the conviction, the prosecution was required to convince the jury that the murder was "cruel, heinous, or depraved" for them to determine that Arias was eligible for the death penalty. The aggravation phase of the trial started on May 15, 2013. The only witness was the medical examiner who had performed Alexander's autopsy. Arias' attorneys, who had repeatedly asked to step down from the case, provided only brief opening statements and closing arguments in which they said that the adrenaline rushing through Alexander's body may have prevented him from feeling much pain during his death. Prosecutor Martinez showed photos of the corpse and crime scene to the jury, then paused for two minutes of silence to illustrate how long he claimed that it took for Alexander to die. After less than three hours of consideration, the jury determined that Arias was eligible for the death penalty.

Penalty phase
The penalty phase began on May 16, 2013, when prosecutors called Alexander's family members to offer victim impact statements in an effort to convince the jury that Arias' crime merited a death sentence.

On May 21, Arias offered an allocution, during which she pleaded for a life sentence. Arias acknowledged that her plea for life was a reversal of remarks that she made to a television reporter shortly after her conviction in which she had said that she preferred the death penalty. "Each time I said that, I meant it, but I lacked perspective," she said. "Until very recently, I could not imagine standing before you and asking you to give me life." She said that she changed her mind to avoid bringing more pain to members of her family, who were in the courtroom. At one point, Arias held up a white T-shirt with the word "Survivor" written across it, telling the jurors that she would sell the clothing and donate all proceeds to victims of domestic abuse. She also said that she would donate her hair to Locks of Love while in prison, and had already done so three times while in jail.

That evening, in a joint jailhouse interview with The Arizona Republic, KPNX-TV and NBC's Today, Arias said that she did not know whether the jury would decide on life or death. "Whatever they come back with I will have to deal with it, I have no other choice." Regarding the verdict, she said, "It felt like a huge sense of unreality. I felt betrayed, actually, by the jury. I was hoping they would see things for what they are. I felt really awful for my family and what they were thinking."

On May 23, the sentencing phase of Arias' trial resulted in a hung jury, prompting the judge to declare a mistrial for that phase. The jury had reached an 8–4 decision in favor of the death penalty. After the jury was discharged, jury foreman Zervakos stated that the jury found the responsibility of weighing the death sentence overwhelming, but were horrified when their efforts ended in a mistrial. "By the end of it, we were mentally and emotionally exhausted," he said. "I think we were horrified when we found out that they had actually called a mistrial, and we felt like we had failed."

On May 30, Maricopa County attorney Bill Montgomery discussed the next steps at a news conference. He said that he was confident that an impartial jury could be seated, but that it was possible that lawyers and the victim's family could agree to scrap the trial in favor of a life sentence with no parole. Arias had said: "I don't think there is an untainted jury pool anywhere in the world right now. That's what it feels like. But I still believe in the system to a degree, so we'll just go through that if that happens." Defense attorneys responded: "If the diagnosis made by the State's psychologist is correct, the Maricopa County Attorney's Office is seeking to impose the death penalty upon a mentally ill woman who has no prior criminal history. It is not incumbent upon Ms. Arias' defense counsel to resolve this case."

Appeals
During the trial, defense attorneys filed for mistrial in January, April and May 2013. Arias' lawyers argued in January that Esteban Flores, the lead Mesa police detective on the case, perjured himself during a 2009 pretrial hearing aimed at determining whether the death penalty should be considered an option for jurors. Flores testified at the 2009 hearing that based on his own review of the scene and a discussion with the medical examiner, it was apparent that Alexander had been shot in the forehead first. Contrary to Flores' testimony at the 2009 hearing, the medical examiner told jurors the gunshot probably would have incapacitated Alexander. Given his extensive defense wounds, including stab marks and slashes to his hands, arms and legs, it was not likely the shot came first. Flores denied perjury and said during his trial testimony that he just misunderstood what the medical examiner told him.

In April, the defense claimed the prosecutor had acted inappropriately and said the case resembled a modern-day equivalent to the Salem witch trials. In the motion the defense team contended "the prosecutorial misconduct has infested these proceedings with a level of unfairness that cannot be cured by any other means." The motion also stated there is a "circus-like atmosphere inside the courtroom" and that Martinez had yelled at witnesses, attacked witnesses on a personal level, and had thrown evidence. The motion also alleged that Martinez chose to release evidence and to pose for pictures with his fans on the steps of the courthouse. The attorneys claimed Arias was in a position in which she could not present a complete defense and that the only constitutional course was to declare a mistrial.

On May 20, 2013, defense attorneys filed motion which alleged that a defense witness who had been due to testify the preceding Friday, the 17th, began receiving death threats for her scheduled testimony on Arias' behalf. The day before the filing, the witness contacted counsel for Arias, stating that she was no longer willing to testify because of the threats. The motion continued, "It should also be noted that these threats follow those made to Alyce LaViolette, a record of which was made ex-parte and under seal." The motion was denied, as was a motion for a stay in the proceedings that had been sought to give time to appeal the decisions to the Arizona Supreme Court.

On May 29, 2013, the Arizona Supreme Court declined to hear an appeal filed three months earlier, which was also refused by the mid-level Arizona Court of Appeals. Nurmi had asked the high court to throw out the aggravating factor of cruelty because the judge had allowed it to go forward based on a different theory of how the murder occurred. The lead detective originally claimed that the gunshot occurred first, followed by the stabbing and slitting of the throat. Based on that theory, Stephens ruled there was probable cause to find the crime had been committed in an especially cruel manner, an aggravating factor under state law. Subsequent to this initial hearing, the medical examiner testified that the gunshot occurred postmortem.

On July 6, 2018, Arias' current attorneys, Margaret M. Green (a.k.a. Peg Green) and Corey Engle, filed a 324-page appeal seeking her murder conviction be overturned to the Court of Appeals.

On October 17, 2019, Arias' attorneys argued to the Court of Appeals that her sentence should be overturned on the basis that Martinez acted inappropriately throughout the trial, resulting in a media frenzy and affecting the outcome of the trial. On March 24, 2020, the court held that notwithstanding "egregious" and "self-promoting" misconduct by the prosecutor, Arias had been convicted "based upon the overwhelming evidence of her guilt," and upheld the conviction.

Sentencing retrial and incarceration
On October 21, 2014, Arias' sentencing retrial began. Opening statements were given, and a hearing on evidence was held. Prosecution witness Amanda Webb, called in the first trial to rebut Arias' testimony that she returned a gas can to Walmart on May 8, 2007, admitted she did not know if all records were transferred after the store relocated. After a holiday break, the retrial resumed in January, 2015. Mesa police experts admitted that Alexander's laptop had viruses and pornography, contrary to testimony in the first trial in 2013. Jury deliberations began on February 12, 2015. On March 2, 2015, the jury informed Judge Stephens that they were deadlocked. Arias' attorneys requested a mistrial. Stephens denied the request, read additional instructions to the jury, and ordered them to resume deliberations. On March 5, 2015, Stephens declared a mistrial because the jurors, who deliberated for about 26 hours over five days, deadlocked at 11–1 vote in favor of the death penalty. The 11 jurors in favor of the death penalty indicated that the sole holdout juror was sympathetic to Arias and had an agenda.

Sentencing was scheduled for April 7, 2015, with Stephens having the option to sentence Arias to either life imprisonment without the possibility of parole, or with the possibility of parole after 25 years. On April 13, Stephens sentenced Arias to life imprisonment without the possibility of parole. By March 5, 2015, Arias' trials cost an estimated $3 million.

In an interview on April 8, 2015, Arias' attorney Jennifer Willmott discussed the social media furor, death threats she received, Arias' statements at the sentencing, the holdout juror, and stated that she believed that Arias testified truthfully.

In June 2015, following a restitution hearing, Arias was ordered to pay more than $32,000 to Alexander's siblings. Her attorney stated this was about one third of the amount requested.

As of 2023, Arias is housed at the Arizona Department of Corrections #281129, which is located at Arizona State Prison Complex - Perryville. She started her sentence in the complex's maximum security Lumley Unit, but has since been downgraded to the medium security level.

Media
The Associated Press reported that the public would be able to watch testimony in the Jodi Arias trial. This decision, made by a three-judge panel of the Arizona Court of Appeals, overruled Maricopa County Superior Court Judge Sherry Stephens' original decision, which would "allow a witness to testify in private, as jurors [weighed] whether to give [Arias] the death penalty." Judge Stephens held secret (non-public) hearings. As a result of the move for secrecy, an unidentified defense witness was permitted to testify in private. Though Judge Stephens' decision had been overruled by the Arizona Court of Appeals, "the mystery witness who testified...at the start of the defense case" was not revealed to the public.

The case, featured on an episode of 48 Hours Mystery: Picture Perfect in 2008, included an interview which, for the first time in the history of 48 Hours, was used as evidence in a death penalty trial. On September 24, 2008, Inside Edition interviewed Arias at the Maricopa County Jail where she stated, "No jury is going to convict me...because I am innocent and you can mark my words on that. No jury is going to convict me."

The Associated Press said the case was a "circus," a "runaway train" and said the case "grew into a worldwide sensation as thousands followed the trial via a live, unedited Web feed." They added that the trial garnered "daily coverage from cable news networks and spawned a virtual cottage industry for talk shows" and at the courthouse, "the entire case devolved into a circus-like spectacle attracting dozens of enthusiasts each day to the courthouse as they lined up for a chance to score just a few open public seats in the gallery;" "For its fans, the Arias trial became a live daytime soap opera." The Toronto Star stated, "With its mix of jealousy, religion, murder, and sex, the Jodi Arias case shows what happens when the justice system becomes entertainment."

During the trial, public figures freely expressed their opinions. Arizona Governor Jan Brewer told reporters after an unrelated press event that she believed Arias to be guilty. She sidestepped a question about whether she believed Arias was guilty of manslaughter, second-degree murder or first-degree murder, but said "I don't have all the information, but I think she's guilty."

HLN staff and their commentators compared the case to the Casey Anthony case for the perceived similarities between Anthony and Arias and the emotions that the cases incited in the general public. Additionally, HLN aired a daily show covering the trial called HLN After Dark: The Jodi Arias Trial. The cable network sent out a press release titled "HLN No. 1 Among Ad-Supported Cable as Arias Pleads for Her Life," bragging that they led in the ratings. The release stated: "HLN continues to be the ratings leader and complete source for coverage of the Jodi Arias Trial. On May 21, HLN ranked No.1 among ad-supported cable networks from 1:56p to 2:15p (ET) as Arias took the stand to plead for her life in front of the jury that found her guilty of Alexander's murder. During that time period, HLN out-delivered the competition among both total viewers (2,540,000) and 25–54 demo viewers (691,000). HLN also ranked No.1 among ad-supported cable networks for the 2p hour delivering 2,227,000 total viewers and 620,000 25–54 viewers."

Investigation Discovery aired in January 2018 a short television series titled "Jodi Arias: An American Murder Mystery." The special explores the death of Alexander and the subsequent legal circus as Arias was tried. It was also featured on another Investigation Discovery program: Who the (Bleep) Did I Marry?

The pilot episode of Murder Made Me Famous, which aired August 15, 2015, chronicled the case.

Arias' case was discussed in the July 19, 2018, episode of Stuff You Should Know as an example of the violation of attorney-client privilege. The episode discussed former attorney Kirk Nurmi's tell-all book, which contained information Nurmi acquired during his representation of Arias.

NBC broadcast a story of the murder on 6 October 2019 in an episode of Dateline titled "Along Came Jodi."

ABC broadcast a story of the murder on 14 February 2020 in an episode of 20/20.

The site of the homicide was featured on Season 2, Episode 1 of Murder House Flip which aired on 12 August 2022 on The Roku Channel. The house received a remodeled bathroom, bedroom and hallway, switching out fixtures that were unchanged from the time of the homicide. During the renovations, the cast of the show found blood residue in the flooring.

Social media
In late January 2013, artwork drawn by Arias began selling on eBay. The seller was her brother; he claimed that the profits went towards covering the family's travel expenses to the trial and "better food" for Arias while she was in jail.

On April 11, USA Today reported that during the testimony of defense witness Alyce LaViolette, public outrage was extreme concerning her assertions that Arias was a victim of domestic violence. Tweets and other social media posts attacked LaViolette's reputation. More than 500 negative reviews of LaViolette's yet-to-be-released book appeared on Amazon.com calling LaViolette a fraud and a disgrace. "It's the electronic version of a lynch mob," said retired Maricopa County Superior Court Judge Kenneth Fields. Attorney Anne Bremner, who said she received death threats after she provided legal counsel in the Amanda Knox case, told The Huffington Post that the kind of online ridicule and threats LaViolette received could affect attorneys and witnesses in high-profile trials. "It's something to take into account," Bremner said. "If I had kids I would consider it even more so."

On May 9, The Republic commented: "The Jodi Arias trial has been a social-media magnet. And when Arias was convicted Wednesday of first-degree murder, Twitter and Facebook exploded with reaction. Much of it was aimed at Arias, though plenty of people tweeted at the media coverage, such as the antics of HLN host Nancy Grace. During the trial, hardcore followers of the proceedings were accused of trying to use social media to intimidate witnesses, or otherwise influence the outcome. Whether it had any effect is questionable, but it's a notable development."

On May 24, Victoria Washington, who was one of Arias' attorneys until she had to resign in 2011 because of a conflict, said "Arias' lead attorney, Nurmi, was pilloried in social media. At one point, an Internet denizen digitally superimposed his face onto a crime-scene photo of Alexander dead in the shower of his Mesa home. I know people were aggravated with him constantly filing for mistrial, but you have to make and preserve the record for federal review (on appeal). If you don't file for mistrial, the appeals courts will say you waived it."

On May 28, Radar Online reported the jury foreman had been receiving threats ever since the panel deadlocked on the sentencing phase, and now his son was claiming he's receiving death threats. "Today I read hate mail my dad had gotten. Some person had sent him a threatening message complete with his email address, full name, and phone number (which at the very least means that this guy should retake Hate Mail 101). I also read some comments on an article online about my dad. Surreal. They say my dad was fooled by the defendant, that he was taken with her, that he hated the prosecutor," his son wrote on his public blog.

The Twitter account in Arias' name is operated by Arias' friends on her behalf. On June 22, from that account, Arias tweeted, "Just don't know yet if I will plea or appeal."

On March 6, 2015, after the retrial of the penalty phase concluded, it was reported that juror #17, the sole holdout, received death threats and police were posted at her house. Dennis Elias, a jury consultant, said "The very fact that people are making death threats and trying to out her, it is not a proud day for any single one of those people and they should be ashamed."

Adaptations
Jodi Arias: Dirty Little Secret, a made-for-television movie, stars Lost actress Tania Raymonde as Arias and Jesse Lee Soffer, of The Mob Doctor and Chicago P.D., as Alexander. Prosecutor Juan Martinez was played by Ugly Betty actor Tony Plana and David Zayas, of Dexter, portrays detective Esteban Flores. Created for and distributed by the Lifetime Network, the film premiered June 22, 2013.

On January 21, 2023, Lifetime did another Jodi Arias movie titled Bad Behind Bars: Jodi Arias which stars Celina Sinden as Jodi Arias, Tricia Black as Donovan Bering, and Lynn Rafferty as Tracy Brown.

See also
Attorney–client privilege
Courtroom photography and broadcasting
Trial by media
Crime in Arizona
Murder of Dale Harrell
Murder of Ryan Poston

Notes

References

External links
 
 
 

People murdered in Arizona
Deaths by person in Arizona
Burials at Olivewood Memorial Park
Events in Maricopa County, Arizona
History of Mesa, Arizona
2008 murders in the United States
June 2008 crimes
2008 in Arizona
2009 in Arizona
2010 in Arizona
2011 in Arizona
2012 in Arizona
2013 in Arizona
2014 in Arizona
2015 in Arizona
Violence against men in North America
Male murder victims
Stalking